The Juan Pablo II Bridge, also known as Puente Nuevo ("New Bridge"), is a bridge in Chile connecting Concepción and Talcahuano with San Pedro de la Paz, through the Biobío River. Since completion in 1974 it has remained the longest bridge in the country. It was significantly damaged in the February 27, 2010 earthquake.

Structure 
The bridge was designed by E.W.H. Gifford & Partners from England.  It is 2310 m. (7.578ft) in length. It is formed by 70 parts of 33 m. each one and with a width of 21.9 m. (including 2 passerby corridors of 1.6 m.)

Naming 
When the bridge was finished in 1974, it had no official name,. People began calling it "Puente Nuevo" ("New Bridge"), as it was the second bridge across the Biobío River after "Puente Viejo" ("Old Bridge"), now closed.  When Pope John Paul II visited Concepción the bridge was named after him as a tribute.

Bridges in Chile
Buildings and structures in Biobío Region
Bridges completed in 1974
Pope John Paul II
Transport in Biobío Region